Crioprosopus servillei is a species of long-horned beetle in the family Cerambycidae.

References

Further reading

 

Trachyderini
Beetles described in 1834